Frederick Douglass High School, established in 1883, is an American public high school in the Baltimore City Public Schools district. Originally named the Colored High and Training School, Douglass is the second-oldest U.S. high school created specifically for African American students. Prior to desegregation, Douglass and Paul Laurence Dunbar High School were the only two high schools in Baltimore that admitted African-American students, with Douglass serving students from West Baltimore and Dunbar serving students from East Baltimore.

Former Supreme Court Justice Thurgood Marshall (1908–1993) is one of Douglass's most notable alumni. After graduating from Douglass in 1926, Marshall went on to college and law school, passing the bar and becoming a lawyer. Representing the NAACP, he successfully challenged school segregation in the landmark Supreme Court case, Brown v. Board of Education (1954). The Supreme Court ruled that segregated, separate but equal, in public education was unconstitutional because it could never truly be equal.

Due to residential segregation and changes in the demographics of Baltimore,  the overwhelming majority of students at Douglass were African American and many were poor.  It was one of the eleven lowest performing schools in the state of Maryland.

History
Named the "Colored High and Training School," Douglass was founded in 1883 for black students in Baltimore, as the school system was racially segregated. Six years later it moved to a site on East Saratoga Street near St. Paul Street (now developed as present-day "Preston Gardens" terraces, named for the former mayor in the five city blocks - north to south - from East Centre Street to East Lexington Streets). This was near and only a few blocks away to the northwest from the former Douglass Institute of 1865 and previous Newton University buildings dating from the 1840s on East Lexington Street (on the north side - between North Calvert Street and North Street [now Guilford Avenue]) which famed Frederick Douglass (1808-1895), who lived in this city during the 1830s, spoke at its dedication. The new high school for young Black Baltimoreans  was the only one for African-Americans students in the City of Baltimore for three decades until Paul Laurence Dunbar High School was built and opened in 1931 on North Caroline Street (off Orleans Street) as a junior-senior high school in East Baltimore. At the time, there was also emphasis on training for industrial jobs.

On June 22, 1894, a year before his death, Frederick Douglass gave a commencement address at what would become a namesake school, saying:

 "The colored people of this country have, I think, made a great mistake, of late, in saying so much of race and color as a basis of their claims to justice, and as the chief motive of their efforts and action. I have always attached more importance to manhood than to mere identity with any variety of the human family..." "We should never forget that the ablest and most eloquent voices ever raised in behalf of the black man's cause were the voices of white men. Not for race, not for color, but for men and for manhood they labored, fought, and died. Away, then, with the nonsense that a man must be black to be true to the rights of black men."  

In 1900, the high and technical school moved from East Saratoga Street near St. Paul Street to a building in the northwest city on the corner of Dolphin Street and Pennsylvania Avenue.

In 1900, the Baltimore City Public Schools system had initiated a one-year training course for African-American elementary school teachers, later known as Coppin State University, an HBCU Historically Black Colleges and Universities was founded at Douglass High School as a normal school (earlier name for a teachers' training school). In 1907, Coppin was appointed its own principal and formally separated from the high school. By 1938, Coppin had developed a four-year curriculum and the college began to grant Bachelor of Science degrees.

The high school moved in 1925 to its third location, a new building specifically designed for the high school was constructed of red brick and limestone trim, in the  English Tudor / Jacobethan style, on the intersection at Calhoun and Baker Streets, but without a surrounding campus but facing directly on surrounding sidewalks.  The new building was dedicated as "Frederick Douglass High School", the school had been using the new name for at least two years previously.  For the first time in Baltimore, black students had a gymnasium, a library, and cafeteria.

Since 1954, following the racial integration of Baltimore City public schools, Douglass High has been located on Gwynns Fall Parkway across from "Mondawmin" - the noted city financiers'  Alexander and George Brown's estate, one of the last rural country estates in the city, which was shortly after razed and redeveloped as  Mondawmin Mall by developer James Rouse (also did "Harborplace" in Inner Harbor in 1979–1980) in the previous Western High School building and extensive landscaped campus, constructed in 1927–1928.  (This building is a twin of the old Eastern High School building on East 33rd Street and Loch Raven Boulevard on the opposite side of the city in Northeast Baltimore, across from The Baltimore City College - the famous landmark - "Castle on the Hill").  The campus of Coppin State College (now Coppin State University), which had long been located at the high school, is across the street .

In 2008, Frederick Douglass High School was the subject of an HBO documentary: Hard Times at Douglass High: A No Child Left Behind Report Card, directed by Oscar award-winning filmmakers Alan Raymond and Susan Raymond. They shot the film during the 2004 - 2005 school year, highlighting its history and its academic and financial struggles while working to comply with the No Child Left Behind Act.

Demographics
Douglass high school, as of 2007, had 1,151 students, of which 52% were female. African American students made up 99% of the total student population with 53% qualifying for free lunch.  The school has 59 teachers for a 1:20 teacher per pupil ratio. The breakdown of students per grade was:
 Grade 9 - 491 students
 Grade 10 - 233 students
 Grade 11 - 212 students
 Grade 12 - 215 students

Notable alumni
 Mark Andrews (graduated 1992), musician with stage name Sisqó
 Sallie Blair, jazz singer
 Clarence W. Blount, first African American majority leader (1983–2003) in the Maryland State Senate
 Lucy Diggs Slowe, founding member of Alpha Kappa Alpha Sorority, Inc., first Dean of Women at Howard University and also a tennis champion, winning the national title of the American Tennis Association's first tournament in 1917, the first African-American woman to win a major sports title.
 Frank Boston, member of the Maryland House of Delegates (1987-1999)
 Roger W. Brown (graduated 1959), Baltimore City Circuit Court judge (1987–2002)
 Nellie A. Buchanan (graduated 1917), taught at Douglass from 1923 to 1970
 Cab Calloway (graduated 1925), jazz singer and bandleader
 Paula Campbell (graduated 2001), recording artist
 Harry A. Cole, first African American elected to the Maryland General Assembly
 Samuel James Cornish (did not graduate), first Poet Laureate of Boston
 Isaiah Dixon (graduated 1941), member of the Maryland House of Delegates (1967–1982)
 Ethel Ennis, jazz singer
 Elton Fax, illustrator
 Dru Hill, R&B recording group
 Lillie Mae Carroll Jackson, veteran civil rights activist, founder Baltimore's  branch
 Terry Johnson, singer, songwriter, and music producer, lead singer of the 1950s Baltimore doo-wop group, The Flamingos
 Bill Kenny, lead singer of, and his brother, Herb Kenny, singer in The Ink Spots
 Labtekwon, hip hop artist
 Thurgood Marshall (graduated 1925), U.S. Supreme Court Justice
 Kweisi Mfume, U.S. Congressman (1987–1996)(2020- ), former president/CEO of the NAACP
 Clarence M. Mitchell, Jr., civil rights activist, namesake of the Baltimore City Circuit Courthouses
 Juanita Jackson Mitchell, civil rights activist, lawyer, first African American female to practice law in Maryland
 Parren Mitchell, U.S. Congressman (1971–1987)
 Margaret "Peggy" Murphy, first black woman to chair the Baltimore City Delegation
Henry E. Parker, Connecticut State Treasurer (1975–1986)
 Alfred Prettyman, philosopher
 Pete Rawlings, appropriations chairman in the Maryland House of Delegates
 Bishop L. Robinson, first African American police commissioner of Baltimore, Maryland

Notable faculty 
 G. David Houston, Professor of English at Howard University

References

External links

 
 Hard Times at Douglass High - film
, including photo from 2003, at Maryland Historical Trust

African-American history in Baltimore
Educational institutions established in 1883
Mondawmin, Baltimore
Public schools in Baltimore
Public high schools in Maryland
School buildings on the National Register of Historic Places in Baltimore
1883 establishments in Maryland
Historically black schools
Baltimore City Landmarks